Qaleh (also Romanized as Qal‘eh) is a village in Virmuni Rural District, in the Central District of Astara County, Gilan Province, Iran. At the 2006 census, its population was 366, in 83 families.

Language 
Linguistic composition of the village.

References 

Populated places in Astara County

Azerbaijani settlements in Gilan Province

Talysh settlements in Gilan Province